Almog is a kibbutz near the Dead Sea.

Almog is also a Hebrew word meaning "coral". It is the name of:

 Almog Cohen (footballer) (born 1988), Israeli footballer

Notable people with the family name Almog include:
 Aharon Almog (de)
 Doron Almog (born 1951), Major General in the Israel Defense Forces, Chair of the Jewish Agency 
 Ruth Almog (born 1936), Israeli novelist
 Ze'ev Almog (born 1935), Commander in Chief of the Israeli Navy
 Oz Almog (born 1956), Israeli-Austrian artist

Almogi 
Almogi is a variant:
 Yosef Aharon Almogi, ne Karlenboym (1910–1991), Poland-born Israeli politician

References 

Jewish given names
Hebrew-language surnames
Jewish surnames